Second Nature may refer to:

Albums 
 Second Nature (Atom Heart, Tetsu Inoue and Bill Laswell album), 1994
Second Nature (Margaret Urlich album), 1999
Second Nature (The Young Gods album), 2000
Second Nature (Katherine Jenkins album), 2004
Second Nature (Flying Colors album), 2014
Second Nature (Netsky album), 2020
Second Nature (Lucius album), 2022

Songs 
"Second Nature" (Dan Hartman song), 1985
"Second Nature" (Rush song), 1987
"Second Nature" (Electronic song), 1997
"Second Nature" (Destiny's Child song), 1998

Musical artists 
2nd Nature (boy band), African-American contemporary R&B group
2nd Nature (TLC), American girl group TLC, also known as 2nd Nature
Uwe Schmidt (born 1968), or Second Nature, German composer, musician and producer of electronic music

Other uses 
Second Nature (2003 film), a 2003 TV film directed by Ben Bolt
Second Nature (2009 film), a 2009 short film by Colin Blackshear
Second Nature (book), a 1992 book by Michael Pollan
Second Nature Improv, a theatre troupe at the University of Southern California
Second Nature Recordings, a record label

See also
Custom (disambiguation)
Habit (psychology)